Plaza de la Guerra, also known as De La Guerra Plaza, is a public plaza in downtown Santa Barbara, California, USA, located right next to the Santa Barbara News-Press offices. It is best known for the activities that take place there during Santa Barbara's annual Fiesta in early August. There are booths, musical performances and many festivities for the downtown area in De La Guerra Plaza. In the 1950s, there was a glass-blowing booth where children could buy and take home glass ornaments as souvenirs. It is named after the Guerra family of California, a historically prominent Californio family.

History
De la Guerra Plaza was a public gathering place and festival area as far back as Santa Barbara's Mexican Alta California era. The plaza is located in front of the de la Guerra Adobe

See also 
History of Santa Barbara, California
Casa de la Guerra
José de la Guerra y Noriega
Pablo de la Guerra
Antonio Maria de la Guerra
Alfred Robinson - Anita de la Guerra de Noriega y Carrillo

References

Parks in Santa Barbara, California